Valiani is a surname. Notable people with the surname include:

Giuseppe Valiani (1730-1800), Italian painter
Bartolomeo Valiani (1793-1858), Italian painter
Valfredo Valiani (born 1960), Italian horse trainer
Francesco Valiani (born 1980), Italian footballer
Leo Valiani (1909–1999), Italian politician and journalist